James Vulavou Damu, known as Jimi Damu (born Savusavu 15 July 1967 - 9 October 2018) was a New Zealand-based Fijian rugby union player. He played as wing.

Career
His first international cap was against Ireland XV, at Lansdowne Road, on 19 October 1985.

He was part of the 1987 Rugby World Cup roster. In the tournament he only played the quarter-final against France, at Auckland and scored a try. He was not called since after Fiji's defeat against France in the 1987 World Cup.
In the squad he was the only player non residing in Fiji, as required by the selection policy at the time.
In the National Provincial Championship he played for Auckland.

Damu also played for Fiji Bitter Marist Sevens.

At the time of the 2011 Rugby World Cup, Damu, along with his brother Ilaitia and former Flying Fijians Koli Rakoroi, Acura Niuqila, Willie Rokowailoa, Inoke Male and Isikeli Tikoduadua formed a committee called Ex-Fiji Reps with a campaign to raise $3 million in less than six months time in order to assist Fiji's preparation for the 2011 Rugby World Cup.

Notes

External links

James Volavou Damu at New Zealand Rugby History

Fiji international rugby union players
Fijian rugby union players
Rugby union wings
Fijian expatriates in New Zealand
1967 births
People from Cakaudrove Province
Living people
I-Taukei Fijian people